Lyman Corbitt McAnally Jr. (born July 15, 1957), known professionally as Mac McAnally, is an American country music singer-songwriter, session musician, and record producer. In his career, he has recorded ten studio albums and eight singles. Two of his singles were hits on the Billboard Hot 100, and six more on the Hot Country Songs charts.

His ninth chart entry came in late 2008-early 2009 as a guest vocalist on Kenny Chesney's cover of his 1990 single "Down the Road". He has also produced for Sawyer Brown and Restless Heart, written several singles for other artists, and is a member of Jimmy Buffett's backing band, The Coral Reefer Band.

Biography

Early life and career 
Lyman Corbitt McAnally Jr. was born in Red Bay, Alabama. As a child, he began playing piano and singing in church at the Belmont First Baptist Church in Belmont, Mississippi, and by age fifteen, he had composed his first song. From there, he went on to become a session musician in Muscle Shoals, Alabama. During a session break, McAnally began to perform original material. The producers there encouraged him, and by 1977 he was signed to Ariola Records. His self-titled debut album produced the single "It's a Crazy World" which reached No. 37 on the Billboard Hot 100. Reviewing it in Christgau's Record Guide: Rock Albums of the Seventies (1981), Robert Christgau said, "although it does often sound pat, as folk stoicism will in a post-folk context, the first side comes across pretty outspoken for a Mississippi singer-songwriter with royalties in the bank—the heroine of one song is a rape victim who murders both assailant and judge after the latter lets off the former. Side two is Joe South."

A second album, No Problem Here, was issued in 1978, followed in 1980 by Cuttin' Corners on RCA Records. These latter two albums produced no chart singles. However, he found success as a songwriter for Jimmy Buffett, in addition to co-writing Alabama's Number One hit "Old Flame".

McAnally continued to record even while writing for Buffett.  Mac eventually signed with Geffen Records with two albums (Nothin' but the Truth, which included the single "Minimum Love" which reached No. 41 on the Billboard Hot 100, and Finish Lines) being issued in 1983 and 1988, respectively. He and Walt Aldridge co-wrote Ricky Van Shelton's 1987 single "Crime of Passion".

1990s and 2000s

In 1990, McAnally signed to Warner Bros. Records, releasing Simple Life that year. This album produced his first Top 40 country hit in the No. 14 "Back Where I Come From." Kenny Chesney would also record McAnally's "Back Where I Come From" for his 1996 album Me and You. Also in 1990, Steve Wariner released a McAnally co-write, the Top Ten hit "Precious Thing." The only other single from Simple Life was the No. 70 "Down the Road", and by year's end, he exited Warner Bros.' roster.

McAnally's seventh studio album, Live and Learn, followed in 1992, producing three low-charting singles. Also that year, he produced Sawyer Brown's album The Dirt Road, and continued to produce almost all of their subsequent albums, in addition to co-writing several of the band's singles between then and the late 1990s, including the Number One "Thank God for You", as well as the Top Five hits "All These Years", "Cafe on the Corner", "The Boys and Me", and "This Time". His second and final release for MCA, 1994's Knots, failed to produce any chart singles, although Linda Davis charted that year with "Company Time", which he wrote. Throughout the 1990s, McAnally also found work as a session musician, playing guitar on several artists' albums, in addition to joining Buffett's road band.

It was not until 1999, when he signed to DreamWorks Records Nashville, that McAnally released his next album. This album, Word of Mouth, also failed to produce any singles. Another album, Semi-True Stories, followed in 2004 on Mailboat Records, the same label to which Buffett is signed. Also in 2004, McAnally and Kyle Lehning produced Restless Heart's reunion album Still Restless, which included covers of three McAnally songs. In 2008, McAnally was awarded Musician of the Year by the Country Music Association. Also in 2008, he participated in the production of the album Psalngs, the debut release of Canadian musician John Lefebvre.

Kenny Chesney covered McAnally's 1990 single "Down the Road" on his 2008 album Lucky Old Sun, as a duet with McAnally. This rendition, released in late 2008 as its second single, became McAnally's first Top 40 country hit since "Back Where I Come From" in 1990. In February 2009, it became his first Number One as a singer. One month later, McAnally signed to Show Dog Nashville, a label owned by Toby Keith. His first single release for the label is "You First". His first album for the label, Down by the River, debuted at No. 56 on the Top Country Albums chart, becoming his first chart entry on that chart since 1990.

In 2011, Mac McAnally released the new album Live in Muscle Shoals on Mailboat Records, recorded in July 2010 at the W. C. Handy Music Festival in Muscle Shoals, Alabama. Appearing with him were the Coral Reefer Band, bassist Jim Mayer and drummer Roger Guth. McAnnally lives in a home in the River Bluff section in Sheffield, Ala., on the Tennessee River.

Awards and nominations

Discography

Albums

Singles

Guest singles

Music videos

Songs written or co-written by Mac McAnally

References

1957 births
Living people
American country guitarists
American male guitarists
American country pianists
American male pianists
American country singer-songwriters
American male singer-songwriters
American country record producers
American session musicians
American mandolinists
Show Dog-Universal Music artists
Singer-songwriters from Mississippi
People from Red Bay, Alabama
Warner Records artists
MCA Records artists
DreamWorks Records artists
Guitarists from Alabama
Guitarists from Mississippi
People from Tishomingo County, Mississippi
20th-century American guitarists
20th-century American pianists
Coral Reefer Band members
Country musicians from Alabama
Country musicians from Mississippi
21st-century American pianists
20th-century American male musicians
21st-century American male musicians
Singer-songwriters from Alabama
Lyle Lovett and His Large Band members